Debadrita Basu is a Bengali TV and Theatre actress. Although her career started with stage plays, she is best known for playing the lead roles of Joyee in the serial Joyee, Alo in the serial Alo Chhaya, both of these aired on Zee Bangla and  Rajkumari Meera / Meerabai in the mythological serial Shree Krishna Bhakto Meera on Star Jalsha.

Early life 
Basu's acting career started with the theater group Ha Za Ba Ra La at age 8. While studying at school, Basu started the theater practice with her father. Drohi Choitonnya was her first theater drama. She had an opportunity through auditioning to work on TV serials.

Career 
Basu played the lead role of the serial Joyee on the Bengali channel Zee Bangla in Calcutta.

She also played Alo Sengupta, the titular protagonist in the soap opera Alo Chhaya.

She was last seen as Meerabai in the mythological drama Shree Krishna Bhakto Meera on Star Jalsha which unexpectedly stopped airing due to low popularity of the show.

Television

Television

References

2001 births
Actresses from Kolkata
Living people